Llanwchaiarn is a village in the community of Llanllwchaiarn, in Ceredigion, Wales, near to New Quay. There is also a Llanwchaiarn in Newtown, Powys.

References

Villages in Ceredigion